Nestor Gonzalez (born 25 September 1937) is an Argentine former wrestler who competed in the 1972 Summer Olympics.

References

1937 births
Living people
Olympic wrestlers of Argentina
Wrestlers at the 1972 Summer Olympics
Argentine male sport wrestlers
Pan American Games bronze medalists for Argentina
Pan American Games medalists in wrestling
Wrestlers at the 1971 Pan American Games
Medalists at the 1971 Pan American Games
20th-century Argentine people
21st-century Argentine people